Jan Gerard Wessels Boer (born 10 August 1936, Haren, Groningen- died Molenaarsgraaf 13 July 2019) was a Dutch plant taxonomist best known for his work on palms.  He has described 37 species, subspecies and varieties of plants, especially in the palm family

References

1936 births
2019 deaths
20th-century Dutch botanists
21st-century Dutch botanists
Utrecht University alumni 
People from Haren, Groningen